The Champion Freedom Falcon is an American mid-wing, T-tailed, pusher configuration, single-seat motor glider that was designed  and constructed by Ken Champion, first flying in 1982.

Design and development
The Freedom Falcon was constructed with a wooden frame, covered with plywood and doped aircraft fabric covering. It mounts a  OMC Golden Phantom Wankel engine behind the cockpit, with the variable-pitch propeller above the tail boom. The  span wing employs a Göttingen 549 airfoil and mounts spoilers for glidepath control.

Only one example was completed and it was registered with the US Federal Aviation Administration in the Experimental - amateur-built category. FAA records indicate that the aircraft's registration expired on 30 June 2011 and was not renewed, so it is unknown whether the aircraft still exists.

Specifications (Freedom Falcon)

See also

References

External links
Göttingen 549 airfoil

1980s United States sailplanes
Homebuilt aircraft
Aircraft first flown in 1982
Motor gliders
Single-engined pusher aircraft